The Florida Marlins' 2010 season was the 18th season for the Major League Baseball franchise. The Marlins played their home games at Sun Life Stadium. On June 23, 2010, Fredi González was fired as manager and replaced with Edwin Rodríguez.  Roy Halladay of the Philadelphia Phillies threw the 20th perfect game in baseball history, and 2nd of the season, at Sun Life Stadium, on May 29, 2010. They failed to make the playoffs for the 7th consecutive season.

Season standings

National League East

Record vs. opponents

Roster

Player stats

Batting
Note: G = Games played; AB = At bats; R = Runs scored; H = Hits; 2B = Doubles; 3B = Triples; HR = Home runs; RBI = Runs batted in; AVG = Batting average; SB = Stolen bases

Pitching
Note: W = Wins; L = Losses; ERA = Earned run average; G = Games pitched; GS = Games started;  SV = Saves; IP = Innings pitched; H = Hits allowed; R = Runs allowed; ER = Earned runs allowed; BB = Walks allowed;  K = Strikeouts

Farm system

LEAGUE CHAMPIONS: Jacksonville

References

External links

2010 Florida Marlins season Official Site
2010 Florida Marlins season at Baseball Reference
2010 Florida Marlins season at ESPN

Miami Marlins seasons
Florida Marlins season
Miami